The variable skink or striped-neck variable skink (Trachylepis laevigata) is a species of skink found in South Africa.

References

Trachylepis
Reptiles described in 1869
Taxa named by Wilhelm Peters